The 2016 World Mixed Doubles Curling Championship was held from April 16 to 23 at the Karlstad Curling Arena in Karlstad, Sweden. The event was held in conjunction with the 2016 World Senior Curling Championships.

Teams
The teams are listed as follows:

Round-robin standings

Round-robin results
All draw times are listed in Central European Time (UTC+1).

Group A

Saturday, April 16
Draw 1
12:00

Sunday, April 17
Draw 5
11:15

Draw 7
17:45

Draw 8
21:00

Monday, April 18
Draw 9
8:00

Draw 12
17:45

Tuesday, April 19
Draw 14
8:00

Draw 15
11:15

Wednesday, April 20
Draw 20
11:15

Draw 22
17:45

Group B

Saturday, April 16
Draw 3
20:00

Sunday, April 17
Draw 6
14:30

Draw 8
21:00

Monday, April 18
Draw 9
8:00

Draw 11
14:30

Draw 12
17:45

Tuesday, April 19
Draw 15
11:15

Draw 16
14:30

Lithuania ran out of time

Draw 18
21:00

Wednesday, April 20
Draw 21
14:30

Thursday, April 21
Draw 25
11:15

Draw 26
14:30

Group C

Saturday, April 16
Draw 2
16:00

Sunday, April 17
Draw 4
8:00

Draw 6
14:30

Monday, April 18
Draw 10
11:15

Draw 11
14:30

Draw 13
21:00

Tuesday, April 19
Draw 16
14:30

Draw 17
17:45

Wednesday, April 20
Draw 19
8:00

Thursday, April 21
Draw 24
8:00

Draw 25
11:15

Group D

Sunday, April 17
Draw 4
8:00

Draw 5
11:15

Draw 7
17:45

Monday, April 18
Draw 9
8:00

Draw 10
11:15

Draw 11
14:30

Tuesday, April 19
Draw 14
8:00

Draw 16
14:30

Draw 18
21:00

Wednesday, April 20
Draw 23
21:00

Australia ran out of time.

Thursday, April 21
Draw 26
14:30

Group E

Saturday, April 16
Draw 2
16:00

Draw 3
20:00

Sunday, April 17
Draw 6
14:30

Draw 8
21:00

Monday, April 18
Draw 9
8:00

Draw 10
11:15

Draw 13
21:00

Tuesday, April 19
Draw 14
8:00

Draw 15
11:15

Draw 17
17:45

Wednesday, April 20
Draw 20
11:15

Draw 21
14:30

Draw 22
17:45

Draw 23
21:00

Thursday, April 21
Draw 24
8:00

Draw 25
11:15

Group F

Saturday, April 16
Draw 1
12:00

Draw 2
16:00

Sunday, April 17
Draw 4
8:00

Draw 5
11:15

Draw 6
14:30

Draw 7
17:45

Monday, April 18
Draw 9
8:00

Draw 11
14:30

Draw 12
17:45

Draw 13
21:00

Tuesday, April 19
Draw 15
11:15

Draw 17
17:45

Wednesday, April 20
Draw 19
8:00

Draw 21
14:30

Draw 22
17:45

Thursday, April 21
Draw 24
8:00

Draw 25
11:15

Tiebreakers
Thursday, April 21, 17:45

Playoffs

Qualification Games
Thursday, April 21, 21:00

Round of 16
Friday, April 22, 9:00

Friday, April 22, 12:30

9th-16th Quarterfinals
Friday, April 22, 16:00

Quarterfinals
Friday, April 22, 19:30

9th-12th Semifinals
Saturday, April 23, 8:30

11 v 12
Saturday, April 23, 12:00

5th-8th Semifinals
Saturday, April 23, 12:00

Semifinals
Saturday, April 23, 12:00

9 v 10
Saturday, April 23, 16:00

7 v 8
Saturday, April 23, 16:00

5 v 6
Saturday, April 23, 16:00

Bronze medal game
Saturday, April 23, 16:00

Gold medal game
Saturday, April 23, 16:00

References

External links

World Mixed Doubles Curling Championship
World Mixed Doubles Curling Championship
Qualification tournaments for the 2018 Winter Olympics
World Mixed Doubles Curling Championship
International curling competitions hosted by Sweden
Sports competitions in Karlstad